Branchinella spinosa is a species within the family Thamnocephalidae. This fairy shrimp species occurs in parts of Southern Africa, notably the Makgadikgadi Pans of Botswana. Other crustacean species found in this region of Botswana in co-existence with B. spinosa include Moina belli.

See also
 Branchinella wellardi

References

Branchiopoda
Crustaceans described in 1840
Freshwater crustaceans of Africa
Taxa named by Henri Milne-Edwards